1001–1011 Jefferson Street is a  proposed skyscraper in Wilmington, Delaware. It would be Wilmington's first skyscraper above . Its site is located across the street from WSFS Bank Headquarters and is 2 minutes from I-95. The tower would feature 35 stories of mixed-use space. The skyscraper was originally proposed in 2013. The tower will connect to an existing nine-story parking garage and a 10-story vacant office building. As of 2016, the tower's site appears to be getting prepared for construction, however, in 2017, site work has paused with the skyscraper now being a vision.

History
Colonial Parking is a company that reserves and operates parking lots and garages in downtown Wilmington, Delaware, and at the Philadelphia International Airport. In 2013 Colonial Parking proposed to turn six of their parking lots in Wilmington into some skyscrapers with parking garages underneath or next to them. 1001–1011 Jefferson Street is the tallest tower proposed by them.

Soon after in late 2015, the skyscraper was approved. In 2016, the site has started to prepare for the new tower, which will rise 510 feet and have 35 stories of mixed-use space such as offices, apartments, condos, retail space, and a 9-story parking garage.

As of 2017, site work has paused and the skyscraper can now be labeled as a vision for the site since no recent news has come up detailing future construction.

See also
 List of tallest buildings in Wilmington, Delaware
 Wilmington, Delaware
 River Tower at Christina Landing
 List of tallest buildings by U.S. state

References

Office buildings in Delaware
Residential buildings in Delaware
Proposed skyscrapers in the United States